This is a list of airports in the Australian state of Victoria.



List of airports
The list is sorted by the name of the community served, click the sort buttons in the table header to switch listing order.  Airports named in bold are Designated International Airports, even if they have limited or no scheduled international services.

Defunct airports

See also

List of airports in the Melbourne area
List of airports in Australia

 
Airports
Victoria
Airports